Bald Eagle is an unincorporated populated place in Blair County, Pennsylvania, United States. It is located in the Bald Eagle Valley at the foot of the Bald Eagle Mountain ridge, along the Big Fill Run near its confluence with the headwaters of the Bald Eagle Creek tributary of the Little Juniata River. Originally a stop on the Pennsylvania Railroad Tyrone Division, it is now exit 52 off  Interstate 99, and was the former northern terminus of the unfinished highway. The Bald Eagle postal zip code is 16686 ( Tyrone, PA ).

Unincorporated communities in Blair County, Pennsylvania
Bald Eagle Valley
Unincorporated communities in Pennsylvania